In nonrelativistic quantum mechanics, an account can be given of the existence of mass and spin (normally explained in Wigner's classification of relativistic mechanics)  in terms of the representation theory of the Galilean group, which is the spacetime symmetry group of nonrelativistic quantum mechanics.

A similar definition applies for  dimensions.

We are interested in projective representations of this group, which are equivalent to unitary representations of the nontrivial central extension of the universal covering group of the Galilean group by the one-dimensional Lie group , cf. the article Galilean group for the central extension of its Lie algebra. The method of induced representations will be used to survey these.

We focus on the (centrally extended, Bargmann) Lie algebra here, because it is simpler to analyze and we can always extend the results to the full Lie group through the Frobenius theorem.

 is the generator of time translations (Hamiltonian), Pi is the generator of translations (momentum operator), Ci is the generator of Galilean boosts, and Lij stands for a generator of rotations (angular momentum operator). The central charge  is a Casimir invariant.

The mass-shell invariant

is an additional Casimir invariant.

somewhat analogous to the Pauli–Lubanski pseudovector of relativistic mechanics.

More generally, in  dimensions, invariants will be a function of 
 
and 
 
as well as of the above mass-shell invariant and central charge.

Using Schur's lemma, in an irreducible unitary representation,  all these Casimir invariants are multiples of the identity. Recalling that we are considering unitary representations here, we see that these eigenvalues have to be real numbers.

(The last case is similar to the first.) In  dimensions, when In , we can write,   for the third invariant, where   represents the spin, or intrinsic angular momentum. More generally, in  dimensions, the generators  and  will be related, respectively, to the total angular momentum and center-of-mass moment by

From a purely representation-theoretic point of view, one would have to study all of the representations;  but, here,  we are only interested in applications to quantum mechanics. There,  represents the energy, which has to be bounded below, if thermodynamic stability is required. Consider first the case where  is nonzero.

Considering the  space with the constraint

we see that the Galilean boosts act transitively on this hypersurface.

The hypersurface is parametrized by this velocity In . Because of transitivity, we know the unitary irrep contains a nontrivial linear subspace with these energy-momentum eigenvalues. (This subspace only exists in a rigged Hilbert space, because the momentum spectrum is continuous.)

We already know how the subspace of the irrep transforms under all operators but the angular momentum. Note that the rotation subgroup is Spin(3). We have to look at its double cover, because we are considering projective representations. This is called the little group, a name given by Eugene Wigner.

This is called spin,  for historical reasons.)

Hence, only the case with a positive mass is physical.
Now, consider the case . By unitarity, 
is nonpositive. Suppose it is zero. Here, it is also the boosts as well as the rotations that constitute the little group. Any unitary irrep of this little group also gives rise to a projective irrep of the Galilean group. As far as we can tell, only the case which transforms trivially under the little group has any physical interpretation, and it corresponds to the no-particle state, the vacuum.

The case where the invariant is negative requires additional comment. This corresponds to the representation class for  = 0 and non-zero .  Extending the bradyon, luxon, tachyon classification from the representation theory of the Poincaré group to an analogous classification, here, one may term these states as synchrons. They represent an instantaneous transfer of non-zero momentum across a (possibly large) distance. Associated with them, by above, is a "time" operator

which may be identified with the time of transfer. These states are naturally interpreted as the carriers of instantaneous action-at-a-distance forces.

N.B. In the -dimensional Galilei group, the boost generator may be decomposed into

with  playing a role analogous to helicity.

See also
 Galilei-covariant tensor formulation
 Representation theory of the Poincaré group
 Wigner's classification
 Pauli–Lubanski pseudovector
 Representation theory of the diffeomorphism group
 Rotation operator

References
 Bargmann, V. (1954). "On Unitary Ray Representations of Continuous Groups", Annals of Mathematics,  Second Series, 59, No. 1 (Jan., 1954), pp. 1–46
 .
 
  Gilmore, Robert (2006). Lie Groups, Lie Algebras, and Some of Their Applications (Dover Books on Mathematics)   

Rotational symmetry
Quantum mechanics
Representation theory of Lie groups